The Bouvet Triple Junction is a geologic triple junction of three tectonic plates located on the seafloor of the South Atlantic Ocean. It is named after Bouvet Island, which lies 275 kilometers to the east. The three plates which meet here are the South American Plate, the African Plate, and the Antarctic Plate. The Bouvet Triple Junction is an R-R-R type, that is, the three plate boundaries which meet here are mid-ocean ridges: the Mid-Atlantic Ridge (MAR), the Southwest Indian Ridge (SWIR), and the South American-Antarctic Ridge (SAAR).

Transform valleys
There are two prominent transform valleys in the area: Conrad transform and Bouvet transform. Conrad transform is named after . Bouvet Island is the highest point on the southern wall of the Bouvet transform.

Development
Up to 10 million years ago the Mid-Atlantic Ridge and the two deep transform valleys of Conrad and Bouvet met in one point. Thus the triple junction was of the ridge-fault-fault (RFF) type. Conrad transform, stretching to the west, connected the end of the Mid-Atlantic Ridge to the South American-Antarctic Ridge. Bouvet transform linked it to the Southwest Indian Ridge on the eastern side.

Currently Conrad transform and Bouvet transform are no longer connected to each other. New spreading sections of the South American-Antarctic Ridge and the Southwest Indian Ridge are growing northward from the eastern end of Conrad transform and the western end of Bouvet transform respectively, striving for the shifting triple point. Thus the Mid-Atlantic Ridge is opening like a zipper. The new spreading sections are somewhat unusual:
 One new spreading section of the South American-Antarctic Ridge is not perpendicular to Conrad fault, violating the perpendicular pattern of alternating spreading ridges and transform faults generally seen on slowly spreading oceanic ridges.
 The new part of the Southwest Indian Ridge is masked by the recently formed Spiess Seamount. This volcanic seamount is the highest point in the area after Bouvet Island. Spiess Seamount was named after captain Fritz Spieß of the German Meteor expedition of 1926.

References

 
 

Plate tectonics
Triple junctions
Bouvet Island
Mid-Atlantic Ridge